Mullagh GAA is a Gaelic Athletic Association club based in the parish of Mullagh, County Galway, Ireland. The club is primarily concerned with the game of hurling.

History
Gaelic games had been played in the Mullagh area for more than 100 years before the foundation of the Gaelic Athletic Association. A game called "hurling over the ditch" was said to have been played and is part of the old folklore of the area. A history of 'The GAA in Mullagh' was published in 1987 by historian Paul O'Donnell.

Honours
Galway Senior Club Hurling Championships (3): 1906, 1929, 1932

Notable players
 Iggy Clarke
 Joe Clarke
 Séamus Coen
 Gerry Coone
 Pete Finnerty
 Davey Glennon
 Derek Hardiman
 Tony Reddin

External links
Mullagh GAA Club

Gaelic games clubs in County Galway
Hurling clubs in County Galway